Knock Knock Loving You (Traditional Chinese: 敲敲愛上你, Pinyin: Qiao Qiao Ai Shang Ni), also known as Quietly Falling in Love with You, is a 2009 romance Taiwanese drama starring Dylan Kuo, Maggie Wu, and Ming Dao. The drama is based on a 2005 Taiwanese romance novel Treasure In The Side (珠玉在側) by Taiwan author Xi Juan 席絹. Filming began on December 23, 2007 on location in Taiwan and Shanghai, China. Filming finished on March 23, 2008. The drama began airing on CTS and GTV on April 12, 2009 on Sunday at 22:00 PM. It finish airing on July 5, 2009 with 13 episodes total.

Synopsis
Cheng Zhi Ang a mousy looking girl that has admired Cheng Xue Ge, who is a talented violinist, since their university days. But her chance to know him is stolen by another due to her act of kindness. This action causes her to realize the deceits of human nature and not to easily trust others so easily. Cheng Xue Ge is a talented violinist who has lived comfortably all his life, and because of his father's wealth he is able to do what he wants which is to play the violin. That carefree life comes to an end when his father's business goes bankrupt. He soon gives up on being a violinist to take over his father's failing business and encounters the backstabbing and ruthlessness of the business world. To learn how to survive in the business world he asks Zhi Ang for help in teaching him how to be ruthless, but later finds out her cold demeanor is a wall she had built to protect herself. But she is persuaded by Zhao Guan Xi who wants her for her business talent before he can realize if he loves her.

Cast

Wei Lin Resort
Dylan Kuo 郭品超 as Cheng Xue Ge 程雪歌 
Liu Shang Qian 劉尚謙 as Cheng Zhi Ang 程志昂

Yao Shi Corporation
Maggie Wu 吳亞馨 as Yao Zi Wang 姚子望 
Chang Chen-kuang 張晨光 as Yao Wan Chuan 姚萬傳 
Feng Yuan Zhen 馮媛甄 as Yao Zi Qi 姚子期 
Ah Mei 阿美 翼勢力 as Yao Hui En 姚匯恩 
Wu Wen Xuan 吳玟萱 as Hui En's mother 
Ying Cai Ling 應采靈 as Zi Wang's mother 
Emma Ni 倪雅倫 as Yao Zi Dai 姚子待 
Huang Qi Wei 黃琦葳 as Yao Zi Lai 姚子萊

Huang Xin Financial
Ming Dao 明道 as Zhao Guan Xi 趙冠希
Coco Jiang 蔣怡 as Zhao Guan Li 趙冠麗

Others
Li Xiaolu 李小璐 as Tang Qing Wu 唐清舞 
Bai Xu Xu 柏栩栩 as Shen Qian 沈謙 
Amanda Zhou 周曉涵 as Xiao Bu 小步 
Pang Yong Zhi 龐庸之 as A Zhe 阿哲 
Xiu Qin 琇琴 as A Zhe's wife 哲妻
Larisa Bakurova 瑞莎 as Guan Xi's girlfriend 冠希女友
Zhou Zi Jun 周子俊 as Zi Dai's husband 子期夫
Guo Shi Lun 郭人豪 as gangster Zheng 
Gao Zhen Peng 高振鵬 as Assistant Gao 
Cai Wang 蔡網 as Tang's father 
Bei Yuan Shan Mao 北原山貓 as aborigine Taiwanese volunteer

Production credits
Original novel: Zhu Yu Zai Ce (珠玉在側) by Xi Juan 席絹 
Director: Ke Han Chen 柯翰辰
Producer: 
Ke Yi-qín 柯以勤
Su Gui-ying 蘇桂瑩 
Production company: Duo Man Ni Ltd. 多曼尼 Ltd

Broadcast

Episode ratings

References

External links
CTS website
GTV website
 CTS official blog

2009 Taiwanese television series debuts
2009 Taiwanese television series endings
Chinese Television System original programming
Gala Television original programming
Television shows based on Taiwanese novels